Fomalhaut is the brightest star in the southern constellation of Piscis Austrinus, the "Southern Fish", and one of the brightest stars in the night sky. It has the Bayer designation Alpha Piscis Austrini, which is Latinized from α Piscis Austrini, and is abbreviated Alpha PsA or α PsA. Since 1943, the spectrum of this star has served as one of the stable anchor points by which other stars are classified.

It is classified as a Vega-like star that emits excess infrared radiation, indicating it is surrounded by a circumstellar disk. Fomalhaut, K-type main-sequence star TW Piscis Austrini, and M-type, red dwarf star LP 876-10 constitute a triple system, even though the companions are separated by approximately 8 degrees.

Fomalhaut was the first stellar system with an extrasolar planet candidate (designated Fomalhaut b, later named Dagon) imaged at visible wavelengths. Analysis of existing and new data suggests Fomalhaut b is not a planet, rather an expanding dust disk resulting from a former collision. The image was published in Science in November 2008. Fomalhaut is the third-brightest star (as viewed from Earth) known to have a planetary system, after the Sun and Pollux.

Nomenclature 

α Piscis Austrini (Latinised to Alpha Piscis Austrini) is the system's Bayer designation. It also bears the Flamsteed designation of 24 Piscis Austrini. The classical astronomer Ptolemy put it in Aquarius, as well as Piscis Austrinus. In the 17th centrury, Johann Bayer firmly planted it in the primary position of Piscis Austrinus. Following Ptolemy, John Flamsteed in 1725 additionally denoted it 79 Aquarii. The current designation reflects modern consensus on Bayer's decision, that the star belongs in Piscis Austrinus. Under the rules for naming objects in multiple star systems, the three components – Fomalhaut, TW Piscis Austrini and LP 876-10 – are designated A, B and C, respectively. On its discovery, the planet was designated Fomalhaut b.

The star's traditional name derives from Fom al-Haut from scientific Arabic    "the mouth of the [Southern] Fish" (literally, "mouth of the whale"), a translation of how Ptolemy labeled it. In 2016, the International Astronomical Union organized a Working Group on Star Names (WGSN) to catalog and standardize proper names for stars. The WGSN's first bulletin of July 2016 included a table of the first two batches of names approved by the WGSN, which included the name Fomalhaut for this star.

In July 2014, the International Astronomical Union (IAU) launched NameExoWorlds, a process for giving proper names to certain exoplanets. The process involved public nomination and voting for the new names. In December 2015, the IAU announced the winning name was Dagon for Fomalhaut b. The winning name was proposed by Todd Vaccaro and forwarded by the St. Cloud State University Planetarium of St. Cloud, Minnesota, United States of America, to the IAU for consideration. Dagon was a Semitic deity, often represented as half-man, half-fish.

Fomalhaut A

At a declination of −29.6°, Fomalhaut is located south of the celestial equator, and hence is best viewed from the Southern Hemisphere. However, its southerly declination is not as great as that of stars such as Acrux, Alpha Centauri and Canopus, meaning that, unlike them, Fomalhaut is visible from a large part of the Northern Hemisphere as well, being best seen in autumn. Its declination is greater than that of Sirius and similar to that of Antares. At 40°N, Fomalhaut rises above the horizon for eight hours and reaches only 20° above the horizon, while Capella, which rises at approximately the same time, will stay above the horizon for twenty hours. Fomalhaut can be located in northern latitudes by the fact that the western (right-hand) side of the Square of Pegasus points to it. Continuing the line from Beta to Alpha Pegasi towards the southern horizon, Fomalhaut is about 45˚ south of Alpha Pegasi, with no bright stars in between.

Properties
Fomalhaut is a young star, for many years thought to be only 100 to 300 million years old, with a potential lifespan of a billion years. Fomalhaut's mass is about 1.92 times that of the Sun, its luminosity is about 16.6 times greater, and its diameter is roughly 1.84 times as large.

Fomalhaut is slightly metal-deficient compared to the Sun, which means it is composed of a smaller percentage of elements other than hydrogen and helium. The metallicity is typically determined by measuring the abundance of iron in the photosphere relative to the abundance of hydrogen. A 1997 spectroscopic study measured a value equal to 93% of the Sun's abundance of iron. A second 1997 study deduced a value of 78%, by assuming Fomalhaut has the same metallicity as the neighboring star TW Piscis Austrini, which has since been argued to be a physical companion. In 2004, a stellar evolutionary model of Fomalhaut yielded a metallicity of 79%. Finally, in 2008, a spectroscopic measurement gave a significantly lower value of 46%.

Fomalhaut has been claimed to be one of approximately 16 stars belonging to the Castor Moving Group. This is an association of stars which share a common motion through space, and have been claimed to be physically associated. Other members of this group include Castor and Vega. More recent work has found that purported members of the Castor Moving Group appear to not only have a wide range of ages, but their velocities are too different to have been possibly associated with one another in the distant past. Hence, "membership" to this dynamical group has no bearing on the age of the Fomalhaut system.

Debris disks and suspected planet

Fomalhaut is surrounded by several debris disks.

The inner disk is a high-carbon small-grain (10–300 nm) ash disk, clustering at 0.1 AU from the star. Next is a disk of larger particles, with inner edge 0.4-1 AU of the star. The innermost disk is unexplained as yet.

The dust is distributed in a belt about 25 AU wide. The disk is sometimes referred to as "Fomalhaut's Kuiper belt". Fomalhaut's dusty disk is believed to be protoplanetary, and emits considerable infrared radiation. Measurements of Fomalhaut's rotation indicate that the disk is located in the star's equatorial plane, as expected from theories of star and planet formation.

On November 13, 2008, astronomers announced an object, which they assumed to be an extrasolar planet, orbiting just inside the outer debris ring. This was the first extrasolar orbiting object to be seen with visible light, captured by the Hubble Space Telescope. A planet's existence had been previously suspected from the sharp, elliptical inner edge of that disk. The mass of the planet, Fomalhaut b, was estimated to be less than three times the mass of Jupiter, and at least the mass of Neptune. There are indications that the orbit is not apsidally aligned with the dust disk, which may indicate that additional planets may be responsible for the dust disk's structure.

However, M-band images taken from the MMT Observatory put strong limits on the existence of gas giants within 40 AU of the star, and Spitzer Space Telescope imaging suggested that the object Fomalhaut b was more likely to be a dust cloud. In 2012, two independent studies confirmed that Fomalhaut b does exist, but it is shrouded by debris, so it may be a gravitationally-bound accumulation of rubble rather than a whole planet.

Herschel Space Observatory images of Fomalhaut reveal that a large amount of fluffy micrometer-sized dust is present in the outer dust belt. Because such dust is expected to be blown out of the system by stellar radiation pressure on short timescales, its presence indicates a constant replenishment by collisions of planetesimals. The fluffy morphology of the grains suggests a cometary origin. The collision rate is estimated to be approximately 2000 kilometre-sized comets per day.

Observations of the star's outer dust ring by the Atacama Large Millimeter Array point to the existence of two planets in the system, neither one at the orbital radius proposed for the HST-discovered Fomalhaut b.

If there are additional planets from 4 to 10 AU, they must be under 20 MJ; if from 2.5 outward, then 30 MJ.

|-
| Outer hot disk
| colspan="4"| 0.21–0.62 AU or 0.88–1.08 AU
| —
| —

Fomalhaut B (TW Piscis Austrini)

A recent age estimate for TW PsA agrees very well with the isochronal age for Fomalhaut, further arguing for the two stars forming a physical binary.

The designation TW Piscis Austrini is astronomical nomenclature for a variable star. Fomalhaut B is a flare star of the type known as a BY Draconis variable. It varies slightly in apparent magnitude, ranging from 6.44 to 6.49 over a 10.3 day period. While smaller than the Sun, it is relatively large for a flare star. Most flare stars are red M-type dwarfs.

In 2019, a team of researchers analyzing the astrometry, radial velocity measurements, and images of Fomalhaut B suggested the existence of a planet orbiting the star with a mass of  Jupiter masses, and a poorly defined orbital period with an estimate loosely centering around 25 years.

Fomalhaut C (LP 876-10)

LP 876-10 is also associated with the Fomalhaut system, making it a trinary star. In October 2013, Eric Mamajek and collaborators from the RECONS consortium announced that the previously known high-proper-motion star LP 876-10 had a distance, velocity, and color-magnitude position consistent with being another member of the Fomalhaut system. LP 876-10 was originally catalogued as a high-proper-motion star by Willem Luyten in his 1979 NLTT catalogue; however, a precise trigonometric parallax and radial velocity was only measured quite recently. LP 876-10 is a red dwarf of spectral type M4V, and located even farther from Fomalhaut A than TW PsA—about 5.7° away from Fomalhaut A in the sky, in the neighbouring constellation Aquarius, whereas both Fomalhaut A and TW PsA are located in constellation Piscis Austrinus. Although LP 876-10 is itself catalogued as a binary star in the Washington Double Star Catalog (called "WSI 138"), there was no sign of a close-in stellar companion in the imaging, spectral, or astrometric data in the Mamajek et al. study. In December 2013, Kennedy et al. reported the discovery of a cold dusty debris disk associated with Fomalhaut C, using infrared images from the Herschel Space Observatory. Multiple-star systems hosting multiple debris disks are exceedingly rare.

Etymology and cultural significance
Fomalhaut has had various names ascribed to it through time, and has been recognized by many cultures of the northern hemisphere, including the Arabs, Persians, and Chinese. It marked the solstice in 2500 BC. It was also a marker for the worship of Demeter in Eleusis.
 It was called Hastorang by the Persians, one of the four "royal stars".
 The Latin names are  "the mouth of the Southern Fish".
 A folk name among the early Arabs was Difdi‘ al Awwal "the first frog" (the second frog is Beta Ceti).
 The Chinese name 北落師門/北落师门 (Mandarin: Běiluòshīmén), meaning North Gate of the Military Camp, because this star is marking itself and stands alone in North Gate of the Military Camp asterism, Encampment mansion (see: Chinese constellation). 北落师门 (Běiluòshīmén), westernized into Pi Lo Sze Mun in R.H. Allen's work.
 To the Moporr Aboriginal people of South Australia, it is a masculine being called Buunjill. The Wardaman people of the Northern Territory called Fomalhaut Menggen —white cockatoo.

Fomalhaut/Earthwork B, in Mounds State Park near Anderson, Indiana, lines up with the rising of the star Fomalhaut in the fall months, according to the Indiana Department of Natural Resources.  In 1980, astronomer Jack Robinson proposed that the rising azimuth of Fomalhaut was marked by cairn placements at both the Bighorn and Moose Mountain Medicine Wheels in Wyoming, USA and Saskatchewan, Canada, respectively.

The fourth boss in the 1992 shoot 'em up video game Thunder Force IV is named after the star.

The New Scientist magazine termed it the "Great Eye of Sauron", due to its shape and debris ring, when viewed from a distance, bearing similarity to the aforementioned "Eye" in the Peter Jackson Lord of the Rings films.

USS Fomalhaut (AK-22) was a United States navy amphibious cargo ship.

See also
 2M1207
 GJ 758
 HR 8799
 Direct imaging of extrasolar planets
 List of extrasolar planets
 List of star systems within 25–30 light-years

Notes

References

External links

 
 Preprint of planet discovery paper
 Astrobites summary of Janson et al. 2012, the Spitzer IR non-detection of Fomalhaut b
 Astrobites summary of Boley et al. 2012, the ALMA observations of the Fomalhaut ring system
 "Eye of Sauron" debris ring
 Researchers find that bright nearby double star Fomalhaut is actually a triple (Astronomy magazine : October 8, 2013)

A-type main-sequence stars
Triple star systems
3
M-type main-sequence stars
K-type main-sequence stars
BY Draconis variables
Hypothetical planetary systems
Circumstellar disks
Castor Moving Group

Piscis Austrinus
Piscis Austrini, Alpha
8728
Durchmusterung objects
Piscis Austrini, 24
0879 81
216956
113368
Fomalhaut
Arabic words and phrases